Mountain King may refer to:

 "In the Hall of the Mountain King", a musical composition by Edvard Grieg
 "The Mountain King" (Mad Men), 2008
 Mountain King (video game), 1983
 Mountain King Studios, a video game developer
 King asleep in mountain, a character archetype in folklore and mythology

See also 
 King of the Mountains